Electrafixion were an alternative rock band, formed by former Echo & the Bunnymen members Ian McCulloch and Will Sergeant in 1994, joined by bass guitarist Leon de Sylva and drummer Tony McGuigan. They released one album, Burned, and four singles and EPs before splitting up in 1996, due to the reformation of the Bunnymen. A posthumous limited edition 7" single, "Baseball Bill" was released in 1997. When touring, the band included Julian Phillips (formerly of Marion) on bass and his brother, George Phillips, on drums.

Discography

Albums
 Burned (1995, WEA/Warners, CD/C, 0630 11248-2/-4) UK No. 38 (2 weeks) released 25 September 1995

Singles
Zephyr EP (1994, WEA/Warners, 12"/cs/cds, YZ 865 T/C/D) UK No. 47 (2 weeks)
"Lowdown" (1995, WEA/Warners, 7"/cs/cds, YZ 977 X/C/CD) UK No. 54 (2 weeks)
"Never" (1995, WEA/Warners, cs/cds/cds, WEA 022C/CD/CDX) UK No. 58 (1 week)
"Sister Pain" (1996, WEA/Warners, cds/cds/cds, WEA 037 CD1/CD2/CD3) UK No. 27 (1 week)
"Baseball Bill" (1997, Phree, 7", PHREE 1)

See also

References

English alternative rock groups
Musical groups from Liverpool
Echo & the Bunnymen
Musical quartets
1994 establishments in England
1996 disestablishments in England
Warner Music Group artists
Sire Records artists
Elektra Records artists